Don Treadwell (born June 10, 1960) is an American football coach and former player. He is currently the interim head coach at Arkansas-Pine Bluff, having previously served as the offensive coordinator and wide receivers coach on Doc Gamble's inaugural staff. Treadwell served as the head football coach at Miami University from 2011 to 2013 and as the offensive coordinator at Michigan State University from 2007 to 2010, where he also acted as interim head coach after Mark Dantonio suffered a heart attack during the 2010 season.

Early life and playing career
Treadwell was born on June 10, 1960 and attended Oberlin High School where he played on the football team as a quarterback. He attended college at Miami University, where he played on the football team as a starting wide receiver from 1978 to 1981. He was named to the All-Mid-American Conference first team as a junior. He graduated from Miami with a bachelor's degree in physical education in 1982.

Assistant coaching career
Treadwell began his coaching career at Youngstown State University under head coach Jim Tressel.  From 1986–1991 he served different stints as offensive coordinator, quarterbacks, wide receivers, and running backs coach. During his time at Youngstown, Treadwell coached alongside defensive coordinator Mark Dantonio, whom he would later work for at Cincinnati and Michigan State.  He also held assistant coaching positions at Miami (Ohio), Stanford, Boston College, North Carolina State, a separate stint at Michigan State, and Ball State. He returned to Michigan State University in 2007 to take over as offensive coordinator, and he employed a balanced attack. After head coach Mark Dantonio suffered a heart attack on September 19, 2010, Treadwell filled in during the interim. He led Michigan State to victories over Northern Colorado and 11th-ranked Wisconsin. After the win over the Badgers, Rivals.com named Treadwell the National Coordinator of the Week. On January 22, 2018, Treadwell returned for a third stint at Michigan State University, this time as the defensive backs coach, special teams coordinator, and also as an offensive consultant. On October 8, 2020, it was announced that Treadwell would reunite with Doc Gamble, whom he worked with at Kent State. He is currently the offensive coordinator and wide receivers coach for Gamble at Arkansas-Pine Bluff.

Head coaching career
On December 31, 2010, Miami University hired alumnus Treadwell as its head coach. He was fired on October 6, 2013.

Head coaching record

References

External links
 Arkansas–Pine Bluff profile

1960 births
Living people
American football wide receivers
Arkansas–Pine Bluff Golden Lions football coaches
Ball State Cardinals football coaches
Boston College Eagles football coaches
Cincinnati Bearcats football coaches
Kent State Golden Flashes football coaches
Miami RedHawks football coaches
Miami RedHawks football players
Michigan State Spartans football coaches
NC State Wolfpack football coaches
Stanford Cardinal football coaches
Youngstown State Penguins football coaches
People from Oberlin, Ohio
Coaches of American football from Ohio
Players of American football from Ohio
African-American coaches of American football
African-American players of American football